The Indian Roller Hockey Championship is the biggest Roller Hockey States Championship in India, and is disputed in men and women.

Teams
The list of participating teams are:
 Haryana
 Chandigarh
 Jammu and Kashmir
 Punjab
 Uttar Pradesh
 Delhi
 Andhra Pradesh
 Tamil Nadu
 Maharashtra
 Karnataka
 Rajasthan
 Kerala
 Madhya Pradesh
 Telangana

Men's competition

List of winners

Number of Indian National Championships by team

Women's competition

List of winners

Number of Indian National Championships by team

References

External links

Indian websites
Roller Skating Federation of India,RSFI
Indian Roller Hockey Forum
News about the championship in Tribune India
Indian Roller Hockey Blog

International
 Roller Hockey links worldwide
 Mundook-World Roller Hockey
Hardballhock-World Roller Hockey
Inforoller World Roller Hockey 
 World Roller Hockey Blog
rink-hockey-news - World Roller Hockey

Roller hockey in India
RollerHockey
India